Carolyn Blanchard (Jensen) Allen (June 13, 1921 – October 9, 2018) was an American politician and funeral home operator who served as a member of the Wisconsin State Assembly from 1963 until 1970.

Background
She was born Carolyn Jensen on June 13, 1921, in Cambridge, Wisconsin, daughter of Clarence B. and Eva (Bilstad) Jensen. She graduated from Cambridge High School, and from the University of Wisconsin-Madison with a Bachelor of Science degree in speech therapy. She married David J. Blanchard September 29, 1943. They moved to David's home town of Edgerton, Wisconsin, where he practiced law. David was elected as a Republican to the Wisconsin State Assembly representing Rock County's 2nd Assembly district in 1954. At the time of his death, he was Speaker of the Assembly.

Legislative career
She was first elected to the Assembly in 1963 in a special election to fill the vacancy caused by the death of David Blanchard. She was the first Wisconsin woman to be elected to the Legislature via a special election, and re-elected in 1964, 1966, and 1968. On August 30, 1969, she married Malcolm V. Allen in her home in Edgerton. In 1970, while easily winning her primary, she was defeated in the general election by Democrat Janet Soergel Mielke by 63 votes (5824 votes to 5761). She attempted to unseat Mielke in 1972, but fell short by a wider margin in what was now the 47th Assembly district.

After the legislature 
For 24 years she lived in Evansville where she and Malcolm operated Allen Funeral Home. He died on May 16, 1987. Allen died on October 9, 2018, in Cambridge, Wisconsin, at the age of 97.

References

1921 births
2018 deaths
Republican Party members of the Wisconsin State Assembly
People from Cambridge, Wisconsin
University of Wisconsin–Madison alumni
Women state legislators in Wisconsin
American funeral directors
21st-century American women